Dehnow-e Bushkan (also Romanized as Dehnow-e Būshkān; also known as Dehnow-e Bushigan) is a village in Deris Rural District, in the Central District of Kazerun County, Fars Province, Iran. At the 2006 census, its population was 686, in 133 families.

References 

Populated places in Kazerun County